Maksim "Max" Mikalaevich Mirnyi (born 6 July 1977) is a Belarusian former professional tennis player.

Mirnyi became a doubles specialist following his singles career, in which he reached a career-high of World No. 18 (August 2003) and finished in the top 50 in the world for seven straight years despite only winning one ATP singles title (2003 Rotterdam Open). He represented Belarus in Davis Cup competition from April 1994, where he holds a record of 47 wins and 27 losses in 35 ties played. He reached the World No. 1 doubles ranking in June 2003 and won ten Grand Slam titles: Men's Doubles in the 2000 and 2002 US Open and the 2005, 2006, 2011 and 2012 French Open; and mixed doubles in the 1998, 2007, and 2013 U.S. Opens and 1998 Wimbledon.

At the 2012 Summer Olympics in London, Mirnyi carried the flag of Belarus at the Opening Ceremony on 27 July 2012, and won the gold medal in the Mixed Doubles with Victoria Azarenka on 5 August 2012.

Career
Mirnyi won the 1998 US Open and 1998 Wimbledon mixed doubles titles while partnering with Serena Williams, and lost the final of the 1999 Australian Open while partnering with her. His best performance at a Grand Slam in singles came when he got to the quarterfinals of the 2002 US Open, defeating Attila Sávolt, Antony Dupuis, Dominik Hrbatý and Roger Federer before losing to Andre Agassi. In the 2004 Davis Cup, he and Vladimir Voltchkov defeated Russia 3–2 and Argentina 5–0, reaching the semifinals, where they lost to the United States. In 2006, he scored an upset against James Blake at Wimbledon. That same year, he and Jonas Björkman defeated the Bryan brothers in men's doubles at the 2006 French Open. In 2011, he and Daniel Nestor defeated Juan Sebastián Cabal and Eduardo Schwank at the 2011 French Open. In 2012, he and Daniel Nestor defeated the Bryan brothers, both at the Queen's Club, UK, and again at the 2012 French Open.

Significant finals

Grand Slam tournament finals

Doubles: 10 (6 titles, 4 runner-ups)

Mixed doubles: 8 (4 titles, 4 runner-ups)

Masters 1000 finals

Singles: 1 (1 runner-up)

Doubles: 29 (16 titles, 13 runner-ups)

Year-end championships

Doubles: 4 (2 titles, 2 runner-ups)

Olympic medal matches

Mixed doubles: 1 (1 gold medal)

ATP career finals

Singles: 4 (1 title, 3 runner-ups)

Doubles: 98 (52 titles, 46 runner-ups)

Performance timelines

Singles

Doubles

Mixed doubles

Doubles partners

References

External links

Official website 
 
 
 

1977 births
Living people
Belarusian expatriate sportspeople in the United States
Belarusian male tennis players
French Open champions
Olympic tennis players of Belarus
Sportspeople from Bradenton, Florida
Tennis players from Minsk
Tennis people from Florida
Tennis players at the 2000 Summer Olympics
Tennis players at the 2004 Summer Olympics
Tennis players at the 2008 Summer Olympics
Tennis players at the 2012 Summer Olympics
Tennis players at the 2016 Summer Olympics
US Open (tennis) champions
Wimbledon champions
Olympic medalists in tennis
Olympic gold medalists for Belarus
Grand Slam (tennis) champions in mixed doubles
Grand Slam (tennis) champions in men's doubles
Medalists at the 2012 Summer Olympics
ATP number 1 ranked doubles tennis players